The Roman Catholic Diocese of Breda is a diocese of the Latin Church of the Roman Catholic Church in Breda, the Netherlands.

Description
It was erected on March 14, 1853, with Johannes van Hooydonk being made its first bishop. The current bishop is Johannes Wilhelmus Maria Liesen. The current cathedral is Saint Anthony of Padua (in Dutch: H. Antonius van Padua) located in the center of Breda.

Its canonical territory consists of the province of Zeeland and part of the province of North Brabant and is subdivided into 112 parishes.

Former Bishops of the Diocese are:
 Johannes van Hooydonk (1853 – 1867)
 Johannes van Genk (1868 – 1874)
 Henricus van Beek (1874-1884)
 Petrus Leyten (1885 – 1914)
 Pieter Hopmans (1914 – 1951)
 Jozef Baeten (1951 – 1961)
 Gerardus de Vet (1962 – 1967)
 Hubertus Ernst (1967 – 1992)
 Martinus Petrus Maria Muskens (1992 – 2007)
 Hans van den Hende (2007 - 2011)
 Johannes Wilhelmus Maria Liesen (2011–present)

The Diocese numbers 136 secular and 159 religious priests and comprises 356 male and 1080 female religious. The number of church goers is nearly 25,000 or 2.2% of the population.

During the sixties of the twentieth century, the relatively strong demarcation between the Catholic south on one side and the Calvinist west and north on the other side of the Netherlands started to diminish. In the second half of the twentieth century a rapid secularization and strong loss of religious affiliation have taken place in North Brabant.

In western North Brabant (Diocese of Breda) is the number of people associating themselves with Catholicism strongly decreased, only 52 percent of the West Brabantians identify as Roman Catholic in 2006. Church attendance is low with only 1 percent of the West Brabantian population visiting churches. North Brabant is mostly Roman Catholic by tradition and still uses the term and certain traditions as a base for its cultural identity, though the vast majority of the population is now largely irreligious in practice. Research among Dutch Catholics in 2006 shows that only 27% of the Dutch Catholics can be regarded as a theist, 55% as an ietsist / agnostic and 17% as atheist.

See also
 Catholic Church in the Netherlands
Wikipedia page in Dutch about Saint Anthony of Padua Cathedral

References

External links

GCatholic.org
Catholic Hierarchy 
http://www.ru.nl/kaski/virtuele_map/publicaties/ rapportnr. 550
Kerncijfers 2005 uit de kerkelijke statistiek van het Rooms-Katholiek Kerkgenootschap in Nederland

Breda
Breda
Religious organizations established in 1853
1853 establishments in the Netherlands
Culture of North Brabant
Culture of Zeeland